David Wills (born September 28, 1970) is an American voice actor, who works with HiT Entertainment, 4Kids Entertainment and NYAV Post. He was formerly a disc jockey under the name Ghosty for Sirius Satellite Radio and was the host of channel 118: Radio Classics under the name Dave Wills. Currently as Ghosty he hosts "That Modern Rock Show" on Saturday nights from 9pm est to 1am est on WFDU 89.1 or streamed through www.wfdu.fm.

Filmography

Animation
 Celebrity Death Match - Various voices
 Funky Cops - Walker
 Thumb Wrestling Federation - The Big Time (season 2)
 Angel's Friends - Additional Voices
 Chaotic - Raznus
 Dinosaur King - Dr. Spike Taylor, Ed
 G.I. Joe Sigma Six - Heavy Duty, General Hawk
 GoGoRiki - Bobo, Doco, Doco’s Evil Clone
 Huntik: Secrets and Seekers - Hoffman
 Jungle Emperor Leo - Coco
 Mobile Suit Gundam Unicorn - Bollard, Additional Voices
 Newbie and the Disasternauts - Zabrowski, Roger 
 Ninja Nonsense - Devil, Dad
 Pat & Stan - Stan 
 Polar Krush - Henderson the Hedgehog, Henry the Hyena
 Robin Hood: Mischief in Sherwood - the Sheriff
 Shura no Toki - Age of Chaos - Additional Voices
 Sonic X - Espio the Chameleon, Mr. Schmitz
 Teenage Mutant Ninja Turtles - Stainless Steel Steve
 TMNT: Back to the Sewer  - Stainless Steel Steve
 Turtles Forever - 80s Splinter, Mirage Shredder
 Tai Chi Chasers - Hak
 Viva Pinata - Fergy Fudgehog

Live-action dubbing

Video games

References

External links
 
 
 Ghosty on the Radio

Living people
American male voice actors
Place of birth missing (living people)
American male video game actors
1970 births